Noah The Best 2022 was a professional wrestling event promoted by CyberFight's sub-brand Pro Wrestling Noah. It took place on November 23, 2022, in Tokyo, Japan, at the Yoyogi National Gymnasium. The event aired on CyberAgent's AbemaTV online linear television service and CyberFight's streaming service Wrestle Universe.

Background

Storylines
The event featured eight professional wrestling matches that resulted from scripted storylines, where wrestlers portrayed villains, heroes, or less distinguishable characters in the scripted events that built tension and culminated in a wrestling match or series of matches.

Event
Event started with the confrontation between Funky Express (Akitoshi Saito and Mohammed Yone) and Kongo (Hi69 and Tadasuke) solded with the victory of the preceding team. Next, Hideki Suzuki defeated Shuhei Taniguchi in singles action. The third match saw Jack Morris picking up a victory over Daiki Inaba in singles competition as well. The fourth bout portraited Masaaki Mochizuki, Masato Tanaka and Naomichi Marufuji picking up a victory against Sugiura-gun (Kazuyuki Fujita, Takashi Sugiura and Timothy Thatcher). Next, Alejandro and Amakusa defeated Dante Leon and Yo-Hey in tag team action. In the sixth match, Kaito Kiyomiya, Masa Kitamiya and Satoshi Kojima defeated Kongo (Katsuhiko Nakajima, Kenoh and Manabu Soya). In the semi main event, Atsushi Kotoge and Seiki Yoshioka defeated Kongo's Hajime Ohara and Shuji Kondo to win the GHC Junior Heavyweight Tag Team Championship.

The main event portraited the confrontation between the reigning champion El Hijo del Dr. Wagner Jr. and Yoshiki Inamura in which the title holder marked his first successful defense of the GHC National Championship.

Results

References

External links
Pro Wrestling Noah official website

Pro Wrestling Noah
CyberAgent
2022 in professional wrestling
December 2022 events in Japan
Professional wrestling in Tokyo
Pro Wrestling Noah shows